Sir Henry Lynch-Blosse, 7th Baronet (14 October 1749 – 1788), was an Irish baronet and politician.

Biography
The life of Sir Henry Lynch-Blosse, 7th Baronet was surrounded by controversy that centred on his relationship with his mistress, Sibella Cottle, by whom he fathered seven illegitimate children. The controversy focused on her residency in the Lynch-Blosse ‘Big House’ in the village of Balla, County Mayo and her reputed use of witchcraft to spellbind Sir Henry to her for life.

Lynch-Blosse was born in London, the first child of Robert Lynch and Elizabeth Barker. Elizabeth was the daughter and heir of Francis Barker, and niece and heir of Tobias Blosse. It was a condition of the marriage that Robert would assume the additional surname of Blosse and conform to Protestantism. Robert changed his surname by a private Act of Parliament of 1748. Henry, better known as Harry, spent the first few years of his life in his mother's home in Suffolk, England.

The family moved to Ireland in 1754 and took up residence at the Lynch-Blosse home in Balla, Co Mayo. When Sir Henry Lynch, 5th Baronet died in 1762, his eldest son, Robert Lynch-Blosse became the 6th Baronet in the succession of Lynch-Blosse Baronets. When Sir Robert died circa 1775, Harry became the 7th Baronet. Shortly afterwards, Sir Harry was elected to the Irish House of Commons representing Tuam. He served in that capacity from 1776 to 1783. Sir Harry was also the godfather of the heiress, Anne O'Donel, who was reputedly abducted by Timothy Brecknock in 1785.

Lynch-Blosse died young in 1788 aged 38 years. He bequeathed generous legacies to each of his seven children by his mistress, Sibella Cottle. Because he died without legitimate heir, the baronetcy passed to his four-year-old nephew, Robert.

References

1749 births
1788 deaths
Politicians from County Mayo
Baronets in the Baronetage of Ireland
Irish MPs 1776–1783
Members of the Parliament of Ireland (pre-1801) for County Galway constituencies